Waterloo railway station is an under construction underground rapid transit station in Waterloo on Transport for NSW's Sydney Metro City & Southwest line. It is scheduled to open in 2024. Consideration was given to building the line via Sydney University, however in December 2015, the State Government confirmed the line would be built via Waterloo.

References

External links
Waterloo Metro station Sydney Metro

Proposed railway stations in Sydney

Railway stations scheduled to open in 2024
Waterloo, New South Wales